Pete Lattu (born 14 August 1979, in Helsinki) is a Finnish actor. He is best known  for portraying Kalle Laitela in the Finnish soap opera Salatut elämät from 1999-2002, and again since 2012.

Pete is married with two children.

Filmography
 Salatut elämät 1999 TV-series (Kalle Laitela 1999-2001, 2002, 2012–)
 Atlantis: The Lost Empire 2001 (Milo's voice in the Finnish version)
 Atlantis: Milo's Return 2003 (Milo's voice in the Finnish version)
 Valiant 2005 (Valiant's voice in the Finnish version)
 Saippuaprinssi 2006 (Leo)
 Ruenalla - The Edge 2006 (Short Independent Film about friendship and extreme sports) (Tero)
 Tali-Ihantala 1944 2007 (Radio Operator)
 8 päivää ensi-iltaan 2008 (barmaid)
 Salatut elämät 10 years 2009 (Kalle Laitela)
 Satula 2015 (Salatut elämät spinoff - Web Series) (Sven-Erik)

References

1979 births
Male actors from Helsinki
Living people